Sandy or Sandy Stevens (née Sandy Stevenson) is a British singer.

Biography
Stevens released several singles during the early 1980s under her birth name, Sandy Stevenson. Later, she appeared on the French music scene as Sandy Stevens or just Sandy in 1988, with her single "J'ai faim de toi", from the album Histoires d'amour. The song was composed by Pascal Stive and Anne Moustrou, and produced by Marc Miller.

The song, originally intended for a TV advert for yoghurt, was released in May 1988 and topped the Top 50 (French SNEP Singles Chart) for two weeks, from 2 to 9 July 1988. The single was certified Gold disc by the SNEP and remained one of the biggest hit of 1988. Stevens was the first British artist to reach No.1 in France.

Discography

Singles
 1980s: "Marguerite"
 1980s: "T'aurais dû"
 1983: "Sandy" (soundtrack from the film of the same name)
 1984: "Everyman's the Same"
 1986: "Love Is Danger"
 1988: "J'ai faim de toi" – No. 1 in France, Gold disc
 1988: "Lies"
 1988: "Comme je respire"

Collaborations
 1988: Les Enfants sans Noël (compilation)
 1988: 75 Artistes pour le Liban (compilation)
 1989: Les Enfants sans Noël (compilation)

References

External links
 Sandy, on Bide et Musique

British women singers
British pop singers
Living people
Year of birth missing (living people)